Lakewood, Illinois may refer to:
Lakewood, Illinois, a village in McHenry County
Lakewood, DuPage County, Illinois, an unincorporated community
Lakewood, Mason County, Illinois, an unincorporated community
Lakewood, Shelby County, Illinois, an unincorporated community